Ashwini Kalsekar is an Indian actress who works predominantly in the Marathi and Hindi television and film industry.

She is known mostly for her collaboration with Hindi movies directors Sriram Raghavan, Rohit Shetty, and Ram Gopal Varma. She played a cop in the popular TV show CID. Her first lead role on television came in 1999 when she starred in Zee TV's popular science fiction comedy serial Mr. Gayab. Her villainous outing as Shalaka Catwoman in the children's superhero serial Shaktimaan made her popular as the first Indian Catwoman. She also played popular negative roles as Jigyasa Walia in Ekta Kapoor's soap opera Kasamh Se, Sikka Thakuriaan in Afsar Bitiya, Maham Anga in Jodha Akbar and Saudamini, an evil witch, in Kavach. She also featured as a judge in the Marathi reality show "Fu bai fu" in 2011.

She debuted in Tollywood like her husband Murali Sharma with Badrinath. Since 2019, she focused on OTT with Zee5's series "Chargesheet: The Shuttlecock Murder", in the MX Player web series "Cheesecake" as Chaaru, an animal communicator, which premiered in December 2019, in 36 Farmhouse on Zee5 and in the Hotstar Specials show Rudra: The Edge of Darkness.

Early life 
Ashwini Kalsekar was born into a Marathi family on 22 January 1970 in Mumbai, Maharashtra. Her father Anil Kalsekar was a bank employee. Ashwini completed her B.A. from Mumbai and graduated in 1991. She pursued theatre from 1991 to 1994 after her studies. From 1992 to 1993, she was studying under actress Neena Gupta to pursue her dream to become an actress. She also trained under Muzammeel Vakil, a theatre acting coach, from 1992 to 1995. Ashwini is also a trained Kathak dancer.

Personal life 
Ashwini married Nitesh Pandey in 1998. They were divorced due to undisclosed reasons in 2002. She then married film and television actor Murali Sharma in 2009.

Career
In an interview to The Indian Express, she said that Shanti was her first acting project. She then worked in successful television serials such as CID, Anjaane, Siddhant and K. Street Pali Hill.

In 1996, Ashwini performed in the Marathi film Tula Jhapar La. This was followed by a number of films in Marathi where she appeared in supporting roles.

Her biggest break came when she was approached by Ekta Kapoor to play the antagonist in her soap opera Kasamh Se, where she played the role of Jigyasa Walia. The role fetched her the Indian Television Academy Award for Best Actress in a Negative Role, the Indian Telly Award for Best Actress in a Negative Role, and other major awards.

In 2012, Ashwini was again approached by Ekta Kapoor to play the role of Maham Anga, a foster mother of Emperor Akbar in her historical drama series Jodha Akbar. The role fetched her critical acclaim and major awards. She went on to win the Indian Telly Award for Best Actress in a Negative Role, the Boroplus Gold Award for Best Actress in a Negative Role, and other major awards.

In 2012, she was a part of a Marathi comedy reality show, Fu Bai Fu. She was the judge of the show, along with Swapnil Joshi and Sanjay Jadhav, for 2 seasons.

In 2014, Ashwini performed the role of Pam Khanna in Ekta Kapoor's soap opera Itna Karo Na Mujhe Pyaar.

Filmography

Films

Television

Web series

Awards

References

External links

 
 

Living people
Indian television actresses
Indian film actresses
1970 births
Actresses in Hindi cinema
Actresses from Mumbai
Indian soap opera actresses
Actresses in Hindi television
20th-century Indian actresses
21st-century Indian actresses
Actresses in Marathi cinema
Actresses in Marathi television